Hypochilus coylei is a species of lampshade weaver in the family of spiders known as Hypochilidae. It is found in the United States. This species inhabits a 35 mile north-south corridor of mountain range in western North Carolina. This species has a two year life cycle and feeds on crickets and spiders.

References

Hypochilidae
Articles created by Qbugbot
Spiders described in 1987